Duke Hu of Chen (fl. 11th century BC) was the founding monarch of the ancient Chinese state of Chen (陳國), established in modern eastern Henan Province soon after his father-in-law, King Wu of Zhou, founded the Zhou dynasty in 1046/45 BC. 

Chen is considered to be the founding ancestor of the surname Chen, one of the most common Chinese surnames, as well as one of the founding ancestors of the surname Hu. The rulers of the Hồ (Hu) dynasty of Vietnam claimed to be Chen's descendants.

Names 

He is also known as Hu Gong Man (胡公滿) and Gui Man (媯滿).

Chen's given name was Man (滿), and his xing (姓) or surname was Gui (媯), which is the ancestor of the surname Chen (陈/陳). 

Hu (胡) was his posthumous name.

Biography
Chen was said to be a descendant of the legendary sage king Emperor Shun. His father Efu (閼父) served as taozheng (陶正), the official in charge of the manufacture of pottery, for the Zhou state. King Wu of Zhou thought highly of Efu, and gave his eldest daughter, Da Ji (大姬), to Efu's son Man in marriage. 

After King Wu conquered the Shang dynasty to establish the Zhou dynasty in 1046/45 BC, he enfeoffed the descendants of three ancient sage kings in the newly conquered land, known as the San Ke (三恪, "Three Reverent States"), and Man was enfeoffed at the state of Chen, with its capital at Wanqiu, in modern Huaiyang County, Henan Province.

After Chen died, he was succeeded by his son Xihou (犀侯), posthumously known as Duke Shēn of Chen. After the death of Duke Shēn, a younger son of Chen, Gaoyang (皋羊), ascended the throne, to be known as Duke Xiang of Chen.

Family 
Wife: Daji (大姬), Zhou Wuwang's eldest daughter

Children

 Chen Shengong (陳申公), older son, 2nd ruler of Chen
 Chen Xianggong (陳相公), younger son, 3rd ruler of Chen

Legacy 
Chen is honoured as the founding ancestor of the Chen surname, which originated in the state of Chen. As of 2020, Chen is the 5th most common surname in China and 4th most common in the world, shared by 70 million people within the country and over 100 million people worldwide (in 2014, there were 54 million in China and 80 million worldwide). 

Some of Chen's descendants adopted his posthumous name Hu as their surname, and Chen is also considered one of the main ancestors of Hu, the 15th most common surname in China. Dozens of other surnames, including Tian, Yuan, and Che, originated as branches of the Chen surname.

The Chen clan would later found the Chen Dynasty of China and then the Trần dynasty, a golden age of Vietnam (陈朝 Tran is the Vietnamese pronunciation of Chen).

In 1400 AD, Hồ Quý Ly overthrew the Trần dynasty and established the Hồ dynasty (Hồ is the Vietnamese pronunciation for Hú 胡). He claimed to be a descendant of Chen Hugong and Emperor Shun, and changed the name of Vietnam from Đại Việt to Đại Ngu (大虞), or Great Ngu (Ngu is the Vietnamese pronunciation for Yú 虞 the legendary pre-enthronement fief of Emperor Shun).

Tomb
Chen's tomb was said to be made of iron and buried under water near the Dragon Lake in Huaiyang County. Archaeologists have found Western Zhou era pottery shards and Warring States-era roof tiles in the area. In 1995, Singaporean businessman Chen Yonghe (陳永和) donated funds to build a new mausoleum and temple complex for Chen in Huaiyang, and it has become a popular pilgrimage site for people of Chen, Hu, and other surnames that originated in the state of Chen.

Memorial 
A memorial of Chen Hugong (陈胡公纪念堂) has been built in Fuzhou, Fujian.

References

Citations

Sources 
 
 
 

Monarchs of Chen (state)
11th-century BC Chinese monarchs
Founding monarchs